Jiucailing is a  mountain in Dao County, Hunan, China. It is the main peak of Dupang Mountains.

Geography
Jiucailing abounds with alpine plants. The main wild animals in the mountain are Cabot's tragopan, Macaque, Flying squirrel, Pangolin, Hoplobatrachus tigerinus, Baeolophus, and Chrysolophus.

References

Bibliography
 
 

Mountains of Hunan
Geography of Dao County